Statistics of Austrian Football Bundesliga in the 1985–86 season.

Overview
Fall season is performed in 12 teams, and higher eight teams go into Meister playoff. Lower four teams fought in Mittlere Playoff with higher four teams of Austrian Football First League.

FK Austria Wien won the championship.

Teams and location

Teams of 1985–86 Austrian Football Bundesliga
FC Admira/Wacker
Austria Wien
Donawitzer
Eisenstadt
Grazer AK
Kärnten
LASK
Rapid Wien
Salzburger AK
Sturm Graz
VÖEST Linz
Wacker Innsbruck

Autumn season

Table

Results

Spring season

Championship playoff

Table

Results

Promotion/relegation playoff

Table

Results

References
Austria - List of final tables (RSSSF)

Austrian Football Bundesliga seasons
Austria
1985–86 in Austrian football